The 2009 Senior Bowl was an all-star college football exhibition game featuring players from the 2008 college football season, and prospects for the 2009 Draft of the professional National Football League (NFL). It was the 60th edition of the Senior Bowl.

The game was played on January 24, 2009, at 6 p.m. local time at Ladd–Peebles Stadium in Mobile, Alabama. The South defeated the North, 35–18, and quarterback Pat White of the South team was named game's Most Valuable Player (MVP). Various players were seen to have either improved or harmed their NFL draft prospects through their play in the game and the week leading up to the competition, which was closely monitored by NFL scouts and the media.

Coverage of the event was in high-definition on the NFL Network. Clothing company Under Armour sponsored the event for the third consecutive year and provided apparel for the game.

Rosters

North Team

South Team

References

External links
 North Team roster
 South Team roster

Senior Bowl
Senior Bowl
Senior Bowl
Senior Bowl